, born August 7, 1943, is a Japanese voice actress from Osaka Prefecture.  Many of her roles have been older women, young boys, or tomboyish young girls.

Filmography

Anime television series
 Akado Suzunosuke  – Akadō Suzunosuke
Andersen Stories - Ib as a Child
 Aria the Natural – Oba-san
 Attack No.1 – Kaori Yagisawa
 Big X – Hans
 Bikkuriman – Jack
 Chibi Maruko-chan – Shouta Yamada, Hamaji's Mother, Maeda's Grandmother
 Demashita! Powerpuff Girls Z – Little Arturo
 Devilman (1972) – Tare-chan
 Doraemon (1973) – Sewashi, Nobisuke Nobi (child)
 Dr. Slump – Akiko-san, Unchi-kun
 Dragon Ball – Grandma Hakkake
 Dragon Ball Z – East Kaiou
 Eagle Sam - Eagle Sam
 Galaxy Express 999 – Boy (Ep. 30)
 Ganbare Gonbe – Gonbe
 GeGeGe no Kitarou – Shisa, Sunakake Babaa Donpei, Obebe, girl
 Hamtaro – Debiham-kun/Spat
 Himitsu no Akko-chan – Chikako
 Kindaichi Case Files – Yurie
 Kinnikuman – Nachiguron, Kinkotsu-Obaba
 Kirby: Right Back at Ya! – Escargon's Mother
 Kiteretsu Daihyakka – Yone (first voice)
 Little Pollon – Eros
 Lupin III Part III – Queen Gretchen
 Mahoujin Guru Guru – Magical Obaba
 Majokko Meg-chan – Rabi Kanzaki
 Moretsu Atarou – Atarou
 Nerima Daikon Brothers – Director
 Nono-chan – Matsuko Yamada
 One Piece – Amazon
 Osomatsu-kun – Choromatsu
 Eagle Sam – Eagle Sam
 Sazae-san – Hanako Hanazawa
 Shugo Chara! – Nobuko Saeki
 Soreike! Anpanman – Kujira no Kutan, Bakeru-kun
 Tiger Mask – Gaboten
 Tatakae! Osper – Osper
 Tensai Bakabon Series – Bakabon
 Zatch Bell! – Riou
 Zenderman – Jimmy

Movies
Crayon Shin-chan: Pursuit of the Balls of Darkness (Ball King Nakamure)
Dorami-chan Mini-Dora SOS! (Arara)
Dr. Slump and Arale-chan: N-cha! Clear Skies Over Penguin Village (Dodongadon)
Kinnikuman Series (Nachiguron)
One Piece: Baron Omatsuri and the Secret Island (Keroko)
Pink: Water Bandit, Rain Bandit (Black)
Pokémon: Destiny Deoxys (Gonbe (Munchlax))
The Girl Who Leapt Through Time (Oba-san)
Crayon Shin-chan: The Storm Called: The Battle of the Warring States (Yoshino)

Games
Kingdom Hearts II (Chicken Little)
Dark Chronicle (Future Rin)
Popful Mail (Gaw)
Super Dodge Ball (Misuzu)

Tokusatsu
Chōriki Sentai Ohranger (voice of Bara Hungry)
Chouriki Sentai Ohranger Movie (voice of Kabochumpkin)
Ganbare!! Robokon (voice of Robokon)

Dub work
Chicken Little (Chicken Little)
Ewoks: The Battle For Endor (Theatrical Release Dub) (Charal)
Fraggle Rock (Tosh)
Jim Henson's The Storyteller (The Queen)
Kids From Shaolin (DVD Dub)
Mighty Morphin Power Rangers The Movie (Rita Repulsa)
Star Wars: Ewoks (Aga)
The King and I (1972 TV Tokyo/Tokyo Channel 12 Dub)

References

External links
Keiko Yamamoto at Aoni Production

1943 births
Living people
Japanese video game actresses
Japanese voice actresses
Voice actresses from Osaka Prefecture
20th-century Japanese actresses
21st-century Japanese actresses
Aoni Production voice actors